This is a list of episodes for the TV series Renegade.

Series overview

Episodes

Season 1 (1992–93)

Season 2 (1993–94)

Season 3 (1994–95)

Season 4 (1995–96)

Season 5 (1996–97)
In the fifth and final season of Renegade, the show aired exclusively on the USA Network. The series' regular timeslot was Friday night. Kathleen Kinmont's character, Cheyenne Phillips, was dropped from the show and did not appear in the final season, except for in a flashback during episode 19 Bounty Hunter of the Year. In her place a new recurring character of Sandy Carruthers was introduced, played by Sandra Ferguson.

References

External links
 
  

Renegade